UK Top 40 was a charts-based programme which aired on Sundays at 6pm on the CBBC channel from 2002 to 2005. The Show relaunched in Autumn 2002 along with the new CBBC line up. The shows launch presenters were Konnie Huq and Adrian Dickson and the show was a huge success they continued it over for another series in 2003.

Series
Adrian and Konnie then both left the show after two series and it was seen as the end of an era. Many thought that the show would become interactive with a voice over but in 2004 it was revealed for the third series that Andrew Hayden-Smith would take over. With the series three rebrand the viewers left due to competition from Top of the Pops which moved to the same time slot.

Series 1 (2002–2003)
The first series was anchored by Konnie and Adrian and contained guests and more fun competitions and games and counted down the top 40 singles in the UK.

UK Top 40: CBBC Viewers Vote (Christmas 2002)
This special hosted by Adrian Dickson and a short report from Konnie Huq who was unavailable due to Blue Peter. This show is when the CBBC viewers get to vote for their favourite songs of that year. It also contained guests and competitions. This aired on Boxing Day at 10:45am on BBC One.

Series 2 (2003–2004)
The second series was reduced by 30 minutes and featured no games but it had a weekly competition and still had a celebrity guest to perform.

UK Top 40: CBBC Viewers Vote (New Year 2004)
This special hosted by Konnie Huq and Andrew Hayden-Smith (who was guest presenting for this special), Adrian was unavailable due to other commitments. This show is when the CBBC viewers get to vote for their favourite songs of that year. It also contained guests and competitions. This year it aired on New Year's Day at 2:45pm on BBC One.

Series 3 (2004–2005)
The final series was 1 hour again and featured competitions but no celebrity guests. It mainly counted down the top 40.

Time Slot
The original time slot was Sundays at 6:00pm for one hour, but in series two a new CBBC show called The Agents was put in that timeslot from 6:00pm–6:30pm so CBBC found as the current time slot was so successful they would reduce the show to 30 minutes and at the new time of 6:30pm.

Presenters

 Konnie Huq (2002–2004)
 Adrian Dickson (2002–2004)
 Andrew Hayden-Smith (2004–2005)

References

External links

UK Top 40 at LocateTV

BBC children's television shows
2002 British television series debuts
2005 British television series endings
2000s British children's television series
Pop music television series
English-language television shows
2000s British music television series